Glory By Honor XVIII was a two-night professional wrestling event produced by Ring of Honor (ROH). It took place on August 20 and 21, 2021 at the 2300 Arena in Philadelphia, Pennsylvania and aired exclusively on Honor Club. The event was the first ROH show to be held outside the state of Maryland (where ROH has been producing shows since their September return) since Gateway to Honor in St. Louis last February. As the name implied, it was the 18th event in the Glory By Honor chronology.

Production

Storylines
The event will feature professional wrestling matches, which involve different wrestlers from pre-existing scripted feuds, plots, and storylines that play out on ROH's television programs. Wrestlers portray villains or heroes as they follow a series of events that build tension and culminate in a wrestling match or series of matches.

Night 1

At ROH Free Enterprise the previous February, Flip Gordon - disguised as Dragon Lee - won a 20-man battle royal to win a future ROH World Championship match. On June 16, it was announced that Gordon will get his match for the title, currently held by Bandido, on night one of Glory By Honor.

Three factions within ROH - La Faccion Ingobernable (LFI), Violence Unlimited (VU), and The Foundation - have been battling with each other since the beginning of 2021 for supremacy and power within the promotion.  During Night 1 of Glory By Honor, LFI and VU will face off in an eight-man tag team match.

Two members of The Foundation - the faction that wants to return ROH to its roots of focusing on technical/"pure" wrestling - will wrestle each other on Night 1 for the ROH Pure Championship, with champion Jonathan Gresham defending against teammate Rhett Titus.

Night 2

At ROH's 19th Anniversary Show, Matt Taven and Vincent fought in an unsanctioned match at the Police Athletic League Hall of Fame, which ended in a no contest after Dutch - the newest member of Vincent's Righteous faction - blindsided both men while they sat on the second story guardrail, causing them to crash through tables. After the crash, Dutch carried Vincent out of the venue, to which Vincent would leave on a "spiritual journey" and not be seen in quite some time. On the May 22 episode of Ring of Honor Wrestling, where Taven and OGK  partner Mike Bennett challenged The Foundation's Rhett Titus and Tracy Williams  for the ROH World Tag Team Championship, Taven was attacked backstage beforehand and had his ankle injured. The OGK would lose the match as a result. After the match, the titantron displayed The Righteous and a returning Vincent, naming him as Taven's assailant. After many more weeks of torment, Taven looked to settle things once and for all on a live edition of his talk show, "Trending with Taven", on the Best in the World Hour One pre-show, where The Righteous were his guests. There, Taven presented Vincent with a contract for one last match, where Taven was willing to leave ROH no matter the result just to get away from Vincent. However, Vincent swayed Taven away from that stipulation, saying while he doesn't want to end Taven's ROH career, he would like his rematch clause for the ROH World Championship. He even added on the stipulation of a steel cage match. Figuring it was the only way, Taven agreed, and the match was set for night two of Glory By Honor.

Also at Night 2, The Foundation - which has been part of the three-way faction war with LFI and VU throughout all of 2021 - will wrestle VU in an eight-man tag team match.

Results

Night 1

Night 2

References 

Glory By Honor
Ring of Honor pay-per-view events
2021 in professional wrestling
2021 in Philadelphia
Events in Philadelphia
Professional wrestling in Philadelphia
August 2021 events in the United States